Lelde is a Latvian feminine given name. The name day of persons named Lelde is December 19.

Notable people named Lelde
Lelde Gasūna (born 1990), Latvian alpine skier
Lelde Priedulēna (born 1993), Latvian skeleton racer
Lelde Stumbre (born 1952), Latvian dramatist

References 

Latvian feminine given names
Feminine given names